Percy Roy Angus (22 September 1893 – 7 July 1961) was a New Zealand railway engineer and administrator. He was born in Wellington, New Zealand on 22 September 1893.

References

1893 births
1961 deaths
20th-century New Zealand engineers
People from Wellington City